Ustad Julhas Uddin Ahmed (10 November 1933 – 24 September 2021) was a Bangladeshi Nazrul Geeti singer and teacher. He was awarded Ekushey Padak for his  special contribution in Nazrul Geeti by Government of Bangladesh in 2017.

Early life
Ahmed was born on 10 November 1933 at Baraikhali village in Sreenagar Upazila, Munshiganj District of the then British India (now Bangladesh) to Yehair Ali Bepari and Hasna Begum. He was the youngest among 9 children of the couple. He lost his eyesight at the age of two suffering from smallpox.

Career
In 1949, Ahmed was sent to Kolkata by his elder brother Farhad Hossain for studying in music. There he was first trained by Chinmoy Lahiri and then by Tarapada Chakraborty for five years in classical music. He returned to East Pakistan in 1955. A year later in 1956, again he went to Kolkata and started practicing classical music with Ustad Amir Khan, Omkarnath Thakur, Nissar Hussain Khan and Ghulam Ali.

From 1961 to 1975, he was a regular Nazrul Geeti performer at Radio of East Pakistan (now Bangladesh Betar). After the independence of Bangladesh, he joined as the head of the Nazrul Geeti program in Bangladesh Television and retired in 1975.

Personal life and death
Ahmed never married. He died on 24 September 2021 from Dengue fever.

Awards and recognition
 Nazrul Gold Medal
 Nasiruddin Gold Medal
 Honored by Shilpakala Academy
 Honored by Bulbul Lalitakala Academy
 Honored by the Rabindra Sangeet Shilpi Sangstha
 AB Bank-Channel i Lifetime Achievement Award (2016)
 Ekushey Padak (2017)

References

1933 births
2021 deaths
People from Munshiganj District
Recipients of the Ekushey Padak
Bangladeshi Nazrul Geeti singers
Deaths from dengue fever